Acrossocheilus parallens is a species of cyprinid fish. It is found in streams and rivers of southern China (Hainan and Guangdong) and Taiwan. It grows to  total length.

References

Parallens
Freshwater fish of China
Freshwater fish of Taiwan
Fish described in 1931
Taxa named by John Treadwell Nichols